Bill "The Buddha" Dickens is an American electric bass guitar player.

Dickens has played  Pat Metheny, George Michael, Joe Zawinul, Janet Jackson, Grover Washington, Jr., Chaka Khan, Mary J. Blige, Freddie Hubbard, Al Di Meola, Dennis Chambers, Steve Morse, Randy Newman and The Hooters.

From 1983 to 1999 participated in three recording sessions of Ramsey Lewis: Les Fleurs, A Classic Encounter and Urban Renewal

He performed with Victor Wooten, Steve Bailey, and Oteil Burbridge on the concert "The Day The Bass Players Took Over The World".

Dickens usually performs using extended-range basses, (or "ERBs"), which are electric bass guitars with more range (usually meaning more strings, but sometimes additional frets are added for more range) than the "standard" 4-string bass guitar. Bill Dickens is best known for playing funk (especially speed funk).

Books 
 Bass Beyond Limits: Advanced Solo and Groove Concepts, Alfred Publishing Co., Inc., 1998, 
 Funk Bass and Beyond, Alfred Publishing Co., Inc., 2003,

Videos
The Bill Dickens Collection (DVD), Warner Bros. Publications, 2003

References

External links 

Bill Buddha Dickens Interview NAMM Oral History Library (2002)

1958 births
Living people
American funk bass guitarists
American male bass guitarists
American soul musicians
Jazz fusion bass guitarists
20th-century American bass guitarists
20th-century American male musicians
American male jazz musicians